Imagine Cinemas is an independently owned chain of cinemas, founded on February 2, 2005. The chain consists of 12 locations with a total of 90 screens in Ontario and British Columbia, making it the third-largest movie theatre chain in Canada, outside of Quebec, and the largest Canadian-owned chain.

History
On February 2, 2005, Imagine Cinemas opened their first theater in Tecumseh, Ontario. They also bought The Palace Theatre in Windsor, Ontario but closed the facility in 2012.

In April 2014, Imagine announced the acquisition of Frederick Twin Cinemas in Kitchener, Ontario.

On May 27, 2016, Imagine announced the acquisition of seven theatres in Ontario formerly owned and operated by Rainbow Cinemas. The following year, they announced the opening a new theatre at the Alliston Mills Shopping Centre. On August 2, 2018, Quebec owned media company UB Media won the rights to represent sales for Landmark Cinemas Canada and Imagine.

October 30, 2019, they acquired Gem Theatre in Keswick, Ontario.

References

External links
 Company website

Movie theatre chains in Canada
Companies established in 2005
2005 establishments in Ontario